Ulmus parvifolia 'D. B. Cole' is a Chinese Elm cultivar that was listed in the Arborvillage Farm Nursery (which ceased trading in 2006) Holt, Missouri, Catalogue of Fall 1991–Spring 1992, p. 21.

Description
'D. B. Cole' is described as smaller growing with a dense head.

Pests and diseases
The species and its cultivars are highly resistant, but not immune, to Dutch elm disease, and unaffected by the Elm Leaf Beetle Xanthogaleruca luteola.

Cultivation
The tree is not known to be in cultivation beyond North America.

Accessions
None known.

References

Chinese elm cultivar
Ulmus articles missing images
Ulmus